Mirror Mirror is the second studio album by American R&B singer-songwriter Kelly Price. It was released by Def Soul on June 27, 2000 in the United States. The album debuted at number 5 on the US Billboard 200 and spent 14 weeks on the chart.

Critical reception

AllMusic editor Michael Gallucci found that "on her second album, [Price] goes through many R&B motions – over-singing, pallid bedroom songs, tuneless tales – but still manages to sound like a genuinely thrilled diva in the process. Filled with slow jams, slick hip-hop, and gospel, Mirror Mirror is a more rounded record than Price's debut [...] She puts an individualist's stamp on the album, a looking glass, if you will, into her soul." Billboard critic Michael Paoletta called Mirror Mirror a "reflection of what lies ahead for Price (and why shouldn't it be?), one thing is certain: She's here to stay."

Chart performance
Mirror Mirror debuted and peaked at number five on the US Billboard 200 in the week of July 15, 2000. It became Price's first top ten entry on the chart, selling 157,000 copies in its first week of release. The album was certified platinum by the Recording Industry Association of America (RIAA) on February 7, 2001. By July 2003, Mirror Mirror had sold 1.07 million copies in the United States.

Track listing

Sample credits
 "Mirror Mirror (Interlude)" contains a sample from "Memory Lane" as  performed by Minnie Riperton.
 "Married Man" contains an interpolation of "Nadia's Theme" as composed by Barry De Vorzon and Perry Botkin, Jr.
 "Like You Do" contains an interpolation of "Ain't No Woman (Like the One I've Got)" and a sample from "Fly Robin Fly" as performed by Four Tops and Silver Convention, respectively.

Charts

Weekly charts

Year-end charts

Certifications

References

2000 albums
Def Jam Recordings albums
Kelly Price albums